St. Andrew's Episcopal Church and Cemetery is a historic Episcopal church and cemetery located near Woodleaf, Rowan County, North Carolina, United States.  It was built in 1840, and is a one-story. frame meetinghouse style building.  It is sheathed in weatherboard and rests on a stone foundation.  Adjacent to the church is the contributing cemetery with 53 inscribed markers.  It is the oldest intact frame antebellum Episcopal church in North Carolina.

It was listed on the National Register of Historic Places in 1982.

References

Episcopal church buildings in North Carolina
Cemeteries in North Carolina
Anglican cemeteries in the United States
Churches on the National Register of Historic Places in North Carolina
Churches completed in 1840
19th-century Episcopal church buildings
Churches in Rowan County, North Carolina
National Register of Historic Places in Rowan County, North Carolina